Mona Menzies  was an Australian Nursing Administrator active through the 1950s to 1980s. She was made a Member of the Order of Australia in 1986.

She was born in 1920 in Wagga Wagga, and held various administrative roles thorough her career, including Registrar of Nurses Board (1952–1958), Council member of the Victorian College of Nursing (1953–1958), and Commissioner at the Health Commission of Victoria (1978–1984).

Honours 

1986: Member of the Order of Australia for services to nursing.

Mona Menzies Postdoctoral Research Grant 
The Mona Menzies Postdoctoral Research Grant awarded up to $50,000 for "PostDoctoral research that relates to improving health outcomes across a number of areas, and/or changing the scope of practice in nursing and midwifery". Megan-Jane Johnstone (AO) was the inaugural awardee of this grant in 1998.

References 

1920 births
Year of death missing

Members of the Order of Australia
Australian women nurses
20th-century Australian women writers
People from Wagga Wagga